"The Village of St. Bernadette" is a song written by Australian singer Eula Parker, Parker received the 1959 Ivor Novello award for Best Song Musically and Lyrically.

Background
"The Village of St. Bernadette" was written at the end of a week long visit to the Occitania town of Lourdes, site of the Sanctuary of Our Lady of Lourdes commemorating the 1858 visions of Bernadette Soubirous. "I wrote the song on the back of an airmail letter," Parker said, "while...waiting [at Tarbes–Lourdes–Pyrénées Airport] for [the] plane...to Paris".

Andy Williams recording
Recorded by Andy Williams - with the accompaniment of Archie Bleyer's Orchestra - the song reached #7 on the Hot 100 in 1960. and was featured on Williams' 1960 album release The Village of St. Bernadette

Other recordings
Anne Shelton released a version of the song in 1959 that reached #27 in the UK.
Bing Crosby recorded the song for his radio show in 1960. 
Jack Jones recorded the song in 1964 for The Jack Jones Christmas Album.
Vera Lynn recorded the song in 1967 for a single release and again in 1972 for the album Vera Lynn - Favourite Sacred Songs.

See also 

 Our Lady of Lourdes
 Saint Bernadette
 Ave Maria

References

External links 

  video of Andy Williams' performance

1959 singles
Andy Williams songs
1959 songs
Cadence Records singles
Our Lady of Lourdes